Restless Development (formerly known as Students Partnership Worldwide) is a non-governmental organization which organizes volunteer placements for young people in the areas of civic participation, livelihoods and employment, sexual rights, and leadership. It operates in 74 countries in Africa and Asia, as well as the United States and United Kingdom.

History 

Restless Development was founded as Students Partnership Worldwide in 1985 by Jim Cogan, the Deputy Head of Westminster School. It was originally a gap year programme for school leavers from Westminster School to work as teachers in India or Zimbabwe. Former volunteers include British filmmaker Louis Theroux and Jamie Drummond, co-founder of One Campaign.

In 1992 SPW started recruiting local volunteers, which subsequently became a significant focus of SPW's operating model. Between 1991-2000 SPW expanded its work to Nepal, Tanzania, Uganda and South Africa, and its work took an increasing focus on the HIV/AIDS epidemic. From 2000 onwards SPW began to use only local volunteers to deliver programmes. Between 2000-2006, SPW expanded to Zambia and Sierra Leone.

In 2010, SPW re-branded as Restless Development, and in 2011 joined the consortium of organizations for the International Citizen Service, a program funded by the UK Department for International Development (DFID), providing overseas volunteer placements for young people to work alongside national volunteers.

From 2011-2016, Restless Development led a 'Youth Consortium' involving Warchild and Youth Business International that held a Programme Partnership Arrangement (PPA) with DFID.

Policy and advocacy 
Restless Development is a member of the Stop AIDS Campaign, with responsibility for coordinating the campaign Youth Stop AIDS! (formerly known as the Student Stop AIDS Campaign.

Since 2012, Restless Development has been in consultative status with the United Nations Economic and Social Council.

From 2014-2016, Restless Development was Organising Partner of the United Nations Major Group for Children and Youth (MGCY).

Awards 
2017
 Transparency Award (Winner) from Bond for NGO effectiveness and accountability.
 Campaign Award (Finalist) from Bond for the Youth Stop AIDS! Missing Medicines campaign.
2018 
 Outstanding International NGO of the Year - Sierra Leone NGO Awards

See also
 WYSE International
 Think Global (charity)

References

External links
Restless Development

Development charities based in the United Kingdom
HIV/AIDS activism
Organisations based in the London Borough of Lambeth
Youth-led organizations
Youth charities based in the United Kingdom
Youth organisations based in the United Kingdom